Cipango is a VoIP extension to the Jetty HTTP Servlets container. It is one of the three Open Source SIP Servlets container compliant with the latest SIP Servlets 1.1 standard. It also offers support of Diameter protocol.

References

External links

 Cipango homepage

VoIP software
Free VoIP software